Two ships in the United States Navy have been named USS Chandler. The first was named for William E. Chandler and the second for Theodore E. Chandler.

She was transferred to Taiwan.

See also
 , a 

United States Navy ship names